Graham Middleton (22 December 1950 – 6 December 2011) was an Australian rules footballer who played with Essendon in the Victorian Football League (VFL). In 1974 he played for Bacchus Marsh.

Sources
 Holmesby, Russell & Main, Jim (2007). The Encyclopedia of AFL Footballers. 7th ed. Melbourne: Bas Publishing.
 

1950 births
2011 deaths
Australian rules footballers from Victoria (Australia)
Essendon Football Club players